Solanum lyratum, the lyreleaf nightshade, is a species of flowering plant in the family Solanaceae, native to China, Taiwan, Vietnam, Cambodia, the Korean Peninsula, and Japan. Usually found in forests, it is also somewhat weedy and can be found on disturbed ground.

References

lyratum
Flora of Tibet
Flora of North-Central China
Flora of South-Central China
Flora of Southeast China
Flora of Hainan
Flora of Taiwan
Flora of Vietnam
Flora of Cambodia
Flora of Korea
Flora of Japan
Plants described in 1784